Rokonuzzaman Kanchan (born 22 June 1982) is a retired striker for the Bangladesh national football team. He last played for Dhaka City FC in the Bangladesh Championship League.

Honours

Abahani Dhaka
 National Football Championship: 2000
 Federation Cup: 1999, 2000

Muktijoddha Sangsad
 Independence Cup: 2005

Bashundhara Kings
 Bangladesh Championship League: 2017

Bangladesh
 SAFF Championship: 2003

Awards and accolades
2002 − Sports Writers Association's Best Footballer Award.

References 

1982 births
Living people
Bangladeshi footballers
Bangladesh international footballers
Association football forwards
Abahani Limited (Dhaka) players
Mohammedan SC (Dhaka) players
Muktijoddha Sangsad KC players
Bashundhara Kings players
Bangladesh Football Premier League players
People from Munshiganj District
Farashganj SC players
Footballers at the 2002 Asian Games
Asian Games competitors for Bangladesh
Arambagh KS players